Whispering Whoopee is a 1930 American Pre-Code short film directed by James W. Horne. It is in the public domain.

Cast
Charley Chase as Charley
Thelma Todd as Miss Todd
Anita Garvin as Miss Garvin
Dolores Brinkman as Miss Brinkman
Kay Deslys as Miss Deslys
Eddie Dunn as Ricketts, the Butler
Dell Henderson as Mr. Henderson
Carl Stockdale as Mr. Stockdale
Tenen Holtz as Mr. Holtz

References

External links

1930 films
1930 comedy films
American black-and-white films
1930 short films
American comedy short films
Films directed by James W. Horne
1930s English-language films
1930s American films